The Bibionomorpha are an infraorder of the suborder Nematocera. One of its constituent families, the Anisopodidae, is the presumed sister taxon to the entire suborder Brachycera. Several of the remaining families in the infraorder (those shown without common names) are former subfamilies of the Mycetophilidae, which has been recently subdivided. The family Axymyiidae has recently been removed from the Bibionomorpha to its own infraorder Axymyiomorpha.

Most representatives of the Bibionomorpha are saprophages or fungivores as larvae with the Cecidomyiidae being predominantly gall-formers. Some sciarids are common indoor pests, developing large populations in potting soil that has become moldy from overwatering. The larvae of the Bibionidae sometimes migrate in large, snake-like masses to minimize dehydration while seeking a new feeding site.

Extinct families
The extinct bibionomorph fauna is:

Cascopleciidae Middle? Cretaceous; Myanmar
Eopleciidae extinct (Lower Jurassic)
Oligophryneidae extinct (Upper Triassic)
Paraxymyiidae extinct (Middle Jurassic)
Protobibionidae extinct (Middle Jurassic)
Protopleciidae extinct (Pan Jurassic)
Protorhyphidae extinct (Upper Triassic)
Protoscatopsidae extinct (Middle Jurassic)
Superfamily Pleciodictyidea extinct
Pleciodictyidae - (Upper Triassic)
Superfamily Protoligoneuridea extinct
Protoligoneuridae - (Upper Triassic)
Superfamily Fungivoridea
Pleciofungivoridae extinct (Upper Triassic) (Lower and Middle Jurassic)
Palaeopleciidae extinct (Upper Triassic)
Pleciomimidae extinct (Lower and Middle Jurassic)
Archizelmiridae extinct (Middle Jurassic)
Fungivoritidae extinct (Middle and Upper Jurassic)
Tipulopleciidae extinct (Middle Jurassic)
Sinemediidae extinct (Middle Jurassic)

References

External links 
 Tree of Life Bibionomorpha

 
Insect infraorders